= Bekeh Ukelina =

African developmental historian

Bekeh Utietiang Ukelina is an African developmental historian. He is a Professor of History and Africana Studies at the State University of New York, Cortland, where he is also the director of the Center for Gender and Intercultural Studies.

He is the author of The Second Colonial Occupation: Development Planning, Agriculture, and the Legacies of British Rule in Nigeria.
